Cleta ramosaria is a moth of the family Geometridae first described by Charles Joseph Devillers in 1789. It is found on the Iberian Peninsula and North Africa.

External links
 Fauna Europaea

Sterrhini
Insects of Turkey
Moths described in 1789